Anatoly Mashkov (born 30 August 1944) is a Soviet speed skater. He competed in two events at the 1968 Winter Olympics.

References

1944 births
Living people
Soviet male speed skaters
Olympic speed skaters of the Soviet Union
Speed skaters at the 1968 Winter Olympics
Sportspeople from Chelyabinsk